Caselle Lurani is a comune (municipality) in the Province of Lodi in the Italian region Lombardy, located about  southeast of Milan and about  west of Lodi.

Caselle Lurani borders the following municipalities: Bascapè, Casaletto Lodigiano, Salerano sul Lambro, Castiraga Vidardo, Valera Fratta, Marudo.

References

Cities and towns in Lombardy